Eclecticus is a genus of flowering plants belonging to the family Orchidaceae.

Its native range is Indo-China.

Species:
 Eclecticus chungii P.O'Byrne

References

Aeridinae
Orchid genera